Regicide is the purposeful killing of a monarch or sovereign of a polity and is often associated with the usurpation of power. A regicide can also be the person responsible for the killing. The word comes from the Latin roots of regis and cida (cidium), meaning "of monarch" and "killer" respectively.

In the British tradition, it refers to the judicial execution of a king after a trial, reflecting the historical precedent of the trial and execution of Charles I of England. The concept of regicide has also been explored in media and the arts through pieces like Macbeth (Macbeth's killing of King Duncan) and The Lion King.

History
In Western Christianity, regicide was far more common prior to 1200/1300. Sverre Bagge counts 20 cases of regicide between 1200 and 1800, which means that 6% of monarchs were killed by their subjects. He counts 94 cases of regicide between 600 and 1200, which means that 21.8% of monarchs were killed by their subjects. He argues that the most likely reasons for the decline in regicide is that clear rules of succession were established, which made it hard to remove rightful heirs to the throne, and only made it so that the nearest heir (and their backers) had a motive to kill the monarch.

There is evidence that regicide and the ability of states to keep or even expand their territories are negative correlated: Firstly, elite violence hindered the development of territorial state capacity, and the killing of rulers also directly resulted in a more likely loss of territory. And secondly, state capacity, reflected by territorial state capacity, could be hypothesized to have had a restraining effect on interpersonal violence. This would be consistent with Pinker’s (2011) view that modern state capacity leads to a reduction in violence, both interpersonal and in terms of military conflict.

Britain 
Before the Tudor period, English kings had been murdered while imprisoned (for example Edward II and Edward V) or killed in battle by their subjects (for example Richard III), but none of these deaths are usually referred to as regicide.

Execution of Mary, Queen of Scots
The word regicide seems to have come into popular use among continental Catholics when Pope Sixtus V renewed the papal bull of excommunication against the "crowned regicide" Queen Elizabeth I, for—among other things—executing Mary, Queen of Scots, in 1587, although she had abdicated the Scottish crown some 20 years earlier. Elizabeth had originally been excommunicated by Pope Pius V, in Regnans in Excelsis, for converting England to Protestantism after the reign of Mary I of England.

Execution of Charles I of England

After the First English Civil War, King Charles I was a prisoner of the Parliamentarians. They tried to negotiate a compromise with him, but he stuck steadfastly to his view that he was King by divine right and attempted in secret to raise an army to fight against them. It became obvious to the leaders of the Parliamentarians that they could not negotiate a settlement with him and they could not trust him to refrain from raising an army against them; they reluctantly came to the conclusion that he would have to be put to death. On 13 December 1648, the House of Commons broke off negotiations with the King. Two days later, the Council of Officers of the New Model Army voted that the King be moved from the Isle of Wight, where he was prisoner, to Windsor "in order to the bringing of him speedily to justice". Then in the middle of December, the King was moved from Windsor to St James's Palace, Westminster. The House of Commons of the Rump Parliament passed a Bill setting up a High Court of Justice in order to try Charles I for high treason 'in the name of the people of England.'  From a Royalist and post-restoration perspective, this Bill was not lawful, as the House of Lords refused to pass it and it predictably failed to receive the Royal Assent. However, the Parliamentary leaders and the Army pressed on with the trial anyway.

At his trial in the High Court of Justice on Saturday 20 January 1649 in Westminster Hall, Charles asked "I would know by what power I am called hither. I would know by what authority, I mean lawful". In view of the historic issues involved, both sides based themselves on surprisingly technical legal grounds.  Charles did not dispute that Parliament as a whole did have some judicial powers, but he maintained that the House of Commons on its own could not try anybody, and so he refused to plead.  At that time under English law, if a prisoner refused to plead, he would be treated identically to one who had pleaded guilty. This has since changed; a refusal to plead is now interpreted as a not-guilty plea.

Charles was found guilty on Saturday 27 January 1649, and his death warrant was signed by fifty-nine commissioners. To show their agreement with the sentence of death, all of the Commissioners who were present rose to their feet.

On the day of his execution, 30 January 1649, Charles dressed in two shirts so that he would not shiver from the cold, lest it be said that he was shivering from fear. His execution was delayed by several hours so that the House of Commons could pass an emergency bill to make it an offence to proclaim a new King, and to declare the representatives of the people, the House of Commons, as the source of all just power. Charles was then escorted through a window of the Banqueting House in the Palace of Whitehall to an outdoor scaffold where he would be beheaded. He forgave those who had passed sentence on him and gave instructions to his enemies that they should learn to "know their duty to God, the King – that is, my successors – and the people". He then gave a brief speech outlining his unchanged views of the relationship between the monarchy and the monarch's subjects, ending with the words "I am the martyr of the people". His head was severed from his body with one blow.

One week later, the Rump, sitting in the House of Commons, passed a bill abolishing the monarchy. Ardent Royalists refused to accept it on the basis that there could never be a vacancy of the Crown. Others refused because, as the bill had not passed the House of Lords and did not have Royal Assent, it could not become an Act of Parliament.

The Declaration of Breda eleven years later paved the way for the restoration of the monarchy in 1660. At the time of the restoration, thirty-one of the fifty-nine Commissioners who had signed the death warrant were living.  Parliament, with the assent of the new king, Charles II, enacted the Indemnity and Oblivion Act, giving a general pardon to those who had committed crimes during the civil war and interregnum, but the regicides were among those excluded from it.  A number fled. Some, such as Daniel Blagrave, fled to continental Europe, while others like John Dixwell, Edward Whalley, and William Goffe fled to New Haven, Connecticut. Those regicides who could be found and arrested were put on trial. Six were found guilty and suffered the fate of being hanged, drawn and quartered: Thomas Harrison, John Jones, Adrian Scrope, John Carew, Thomas Scot, and Gregory Clement. The captain of the guard at the trial, Daniel Axtell, who encouraged his men to barrack the King when he tried to speak in his own defence, an influential preacher, Hugh Peters, and the leading prosecutor at the trial, John Cook, were executed in a similar manner. Colonel Francis Hacker, who signed the order to the executioner of the king and commanded the guard around the scaffold and at the trial, was hanged. Concern amongst the royal ministers over the negative impact on popular sentiment of these public tortures and executions led to jail sentences being substituted for the remaining regicides.

Some regicides, such as Richard Ingoldsby and Philip Nye, were conditionally pardoned, while a further nineteen served life imprisonment. The bodies of the regicides Cromwell, Bradshaw, and Ireton, which had been buried in Westminster Abbey, were disinterred and hanged, drawn and quartered in posthumous executions. In 1662, three more regicides, John Okey, John Barkstead and Miles Corbet, were also hanged, drawn and quartered. The officers of the court that tried Charles I, those who prosecuted him, and those who signed his death warrant, have been known ever since the restoration as regicides.

The Parliamentary Archives in the Palace of Westminster, London, holds the original death warrant for Charles I.

Britain 1760–1850 
Some people throughout in the 1760–1850 period in England and Great Britain who have been suspected, arrested, and perhaps punished for trying to lethally harm the reigning monarch, which has sometimes been understood to be attempted "regicide", do not appear to have had the intention of actually killing the king or queen. According to Poole (2000), the actions and utterances of English figures such as Nicholson, Firth, Sutherland, Hadfield, Collins, Oxford, Francis and Bean, all of whom tried to get the monarch's attention for some matter, "point more often to physical remonstance after experiences of extreme frustration with an ineffectual petitioning process." Others who did try to kill the ruler did so not in order to replace the monarchy with a republic, but because they hoped that their successor would be a better ruler, and able to address certain issues which, in the would-be assassins' views, the current sovereign failed to properly act on. According to British radical orator John Thelwall (1764–1834), regicide was simply a means of replacing an unacceptable monarch with a better one.

France 
On 25 June 1836, a Frenchman named Alibaud attempted to assassinate the "July Monarch" Louis Philippe I by shooting him. At trial, Alibaud held the king responsible for the economic ruin of his family, compared himself to Marcus Junius Brutus (most well-known amongst the assassins of Julius Caesar), and stated: "Regicide is the right of all men who are debarred from any justice but that which they take into their own hands." He was executed by guillotine.

Mexico 
The separate 19th century executions of two of Mexico’s emperors were carried out by Republicans.

After the abolishment of the First Mexican Empire, Agustin I was first exiled and on 11 May 1823, the ex-emperor boarded the British ship Rawlins en route to Livorno, Italy (then part of the Grand Duchy of Tuscany), accompanied by his wife, children, and some servants. After Conservative political factions in Mexico finally convinced Iturbide to return, and unaware of the consequences of a law aimed solely at him, he was taken prisoner by a general he had himself pardoned as emperor. He was executed by firing squad on 19 July 1824. The aftermath of his execution was met with indignation by Mexican royalists. The sentiment of those horrified by the execution was compiled by novelist Enrique de Olavarría y Ferrari in "El cadalso de Padilla:" "Done is the dark crime, for which we will doubtlessly be called Parricides." 

Later, after the downfall of the Second Mexican Empire, which saw the reign of Maximilian I of Mexico—a member of the House of Habsburg, which had previously ruled Mexico as New Spain from the 16th to 18th century— the Republican forces of Benito Juarez, with aid from the U.S. and sabotage by Colonel Miguel López, captured and executed him on 19 June 1867. Emperor Maximilian’s last words were “…May my blood which is about to be spilled end the bloodshed which has been experienced in my new motherland. Long live Mexico! Long live its independence!".

Portugal

Iraq 

On July 14th, 1958, at least four members of the ruling Hashemite family (including the King and the Crown Prince) of the Kingdom of Iraq were killed by revolutionaries of the  Nationalist Officers' Organization under the command of Abdul Salam Arif.

Usurpation

Regicide has particular resonance within the concept of the divine right of kings, whereby monarchs were presumed by decision of God to have a divinely anointed authority to rule. As such, an attack on a king by one of his own subjects was taken to amount to a direct challenge to the monarch, to his divine right to rule, and thus to God's will.

The biblical David refused to harm King Saul, because he was the Lord's anointed, even though Saul was seeking his life; and when Saul eventually was killed in battle and a person reported to David that he helped kill Saul, David put the man to death, even though Saul had been his enemy, because he had raised his hands against the Lord's anointed. Christian concepts of the inviolability of the person of the monarch have great influence from this story. Diarmait mac Cerbaill, King of Tara (mentioned above), was killed by Áed Dub mac Suibni in 565. According to Adomnan of Iona's Life of St Columba, Áed Dub mac Suibni received God's punishment for this crime by being impaled by a treacherous spear many years later and then falling from his ship into a lake and drowning.

Even after the disappearance of the divine right of kings and the appearance of constitutional monarchies, the term continued and continues to be used to describe the murder of a king.

In France, the judicial penalty for regicides (i.e. those who had murdered, or attempted to murder, the king) was especially hard, even in regard to the harsh judicial practices of pre-revolutionary France. As with many criminals, the regicide was tortured so as to make him tell the names of his accomplices. However, the method of execution itself was a form of torture. Here is a description of the death of Robert-François Damiens, who attempted to kill Louis XV:

In Discipline and Punish, the French philosopher Michel Foucault cites this case of Damiens the Regicide as an example of disproportionate punishment in the era preceding the "Age of Reason".  The classical school of criminology asserts that the punishment "should fit the crime", and should thus be proportionate and not extreme.  This approach was spoofed by Gilbert and Sullivan, when The Mikado sang, "My object all sublime, I shall achieve in time, to let the punishment fit the crime".

In common with earlier executions for regicides:
 the hand that attempted the murder is burnt
 the regicide is dismembered alive

In both the François Ravaillac and the Damiens cases, court papers refer to the offenders as a patricide, rather than as regicide, which lets one deduce that, through divine right, the king was also regarded as "Father of the country".

See also
 List of regicides
 Fifth Monarchists saw the overthrow of Charles I as a divine sign of the second coming of Jesus.
 Society of King Charles the Martyr
 Monarchomachs
 Fratricide (killing one's brother)
 Matricide (killing one's mother)
 Patricide (killing of one's father)
 Sororicide (killing one's sister)
 Tyrannicide (killing of a tyrant)

Notes

References

Further reading
 David Lagomarsino, Charles T. Wood (Editor) The Trial of Charles I: A Documentary History Pub: Dartmouth College, (1989), 
 
 Geoffrey Robertson The Tyrannicide Brief, Pub: Random House, (2005),

External links

Monarchy
 
Murder
Treason
Killings by type